Fauja Singh Keeps Going is a 2020 children's book that tells the story of Sikh centenarian Fauja Singh, who in 2011 claimed to be the oldest person to have completed a marathon. The book is written by Simran Jeet Singh and has illustrations by Baljinder Kaur and foreword written by Fauja Singh.

References 

 
2020 children's books
American children's books
Books about Sikhism
Running books